Chupika (Aymara for "colored", Hispanicized spelling Chupica) is a mountain in the Cusco Region in the Andes of Peru, about  high. It is situated in the Canchis Province, on the border of the districts Checacupe and Pitumarca.

References

Mountains of Peru
Mountains of Cusco Region